Ryan Thomas (born March 20, 1989 in Claremont, California) is an American soccer player who most recently played for Los Angeles Galaxy in Major League Soccer.

Career

College and Amateur
Thomas played his college soccer career at Stanford University. Thomas had two goals and 12 assists in his four years with the Cardinal, helping them reach the Third Round of the NCAA Tournament as a junior in 2009. A three-time UYSA national champion with Arsenal FC where he was teammate of Héctor Jiménez, Thomas had three assists in each of his four years at Stanford and was named Second Team All-Pac-10 as a senior in 2010 after being an Honorable Mention All-Pac-10 honoree as a junior when he played in and started a career-high 20 games.

Professional
On January 18, 2011, Thomas was drafted in the first round (16th overall) in the 2011 MLS Supplemental Draft by Los Angeles Galaxy.

Los Angeles released Thomas on February 13, 2012.

Honors

Los Angeles Galaxy
MLS Cup (1): 2011
Major League Soccer Supporters' Shield (1): 2011
Major League Soccer Western Conference Championship (1): 2011

References

External links
 Stanford profile
 

1989 births
Living people
American soccer players
Association football defenders
LA Galaxy draft picks
LA Galaxy players
Major League Soccer players
People from Claremont, California
Soccer players from California
Sportspeople from Los Angeles County, California
Stanford Cardinal men's soccer players